Elocation is the second studio album by Canadian hard rock band Default. It was released on November 25, 2003 by TVT Records. The album spawned three singles, including the song "(Taking My) Life Away", which aired on Muzak's Power Rock station. This album failed to match the success of their debut, but is the band's second most commercially successful album being certified Gold in Canada. The final track, an acoustic version of "Let You Down," originally appeared on their previous album.

The album was produced by Butch Walker and Nickelback's Chad Kroeger and contains a cover of the song "Cruel" by Jeff Buckley.

Critical reception
Tom Harrison of The Province rated the album three stars out of four. He thought that the band showed creative growth from their previous album.

Track listing
All tracks by Default except where noted.
Elocation – Standard Edition

Bonus tracks
"Cruel" (Acoustic) - 4:25  (from a TVT Records Sampler 2005) (German Count on Me CDS)
"(Taking My) Life Away" (Acoustic) - 4:10 (from a 2003 promotional test pressing CD single)

Personnel

Charts and certifications

Album

Singles

Certifications

References

Default (band) albums
2003 albums
Albums produced by Butch Walker